Prairie Hill is an unincorporated community in eastern Chariton County, Missouri, United States. The community is located at the intersection of Missouri routes W and HH approximately seven miles north-northeast of Salisbury. The Thomas Hill Reservoir dam is seven miles to the northeast in adjacent Randolph County.

A post office called Prairie Hill was established in 1869, and remained in operation until 1966. The community was named for its elevated location upon a prairie.

Demographics

References

Unincorporated communities in Chariton County, Missouri
Unincorporated communities in Missouri